The PHC Classic was a tournament on the Symetra Tour, the LPGA's developmental tour. It was part of the Symetra Tour's schedule between 2015 and 2020. It was held at Brown Deer Park Golf Course in Milwaukee, Wisconsin, host venue for the PGA Tour's Greater Milwaukee Open.

The 2020 tournament was cancelled due to the COVID-19 pandemic.

Title sponsor Potawatomi Hotel & Casino later suspended its sponsorship due to COVID-19's impact on the hospitality industry.

Winners

References

External links

Former Symetra Tour events
Golf in Wisconsin